The Sydney Harbour Transport Board was a statutory of the Government of New South Wales responsible for the provision of ferry services on Sydney Harbour from July 1951 until November 1974.

History
With its Sydney Harbour services having become unprofitable, in March 1951 Sydney Ferries Limited advised the Government of New South Wales of its intention to cease operating ferry services on Sydney Harbour.

After investigating the possibility of using statutory powers to compulsorily acquire the business without paying compensation, the government agreed to purchase the business with 15 ferries from 1 July 1951. As the board did not have any experience of ferry management, day-to-day running was contracted out to the Port Jackson & Manly Steamship Company.

In 1956, the Kooleen was purchased. This single deck ferry which the SHTB intended would be the first of many had no outside seating and was much derided. As a result, it was decided to retain the existing fleet, albeit with the remaining steam powered examples converted to diesel power. Between 1968 and 1970, three Lady class ferries were purchased.

See also
 Timeline of Sydney Harbour ferries

References

Ferry companies of New South Wales
Ferry transport in Sydney
Defunct government entities of New South Wales
1951 establishments in Australia
1974 disestablishments in Australia
Sydney Harbour
Defunct transport organisations based in Australia